George Platt Waller Jr. (September 7, 1889 – February 26, 1962) was an American diplomat and the United States chargé d'affaires in Luxembourg during World War II.

Biography

Early life
George Platt Waller Jr. was born to George Platt and  Susan Theresa Jones in Montgomery, Alabama on September 7, 1889. He was home schooled and attended public school until he enrolled in Marion Military Institute in 1905 until 1907. Afterwards he attended the University of Virginia, graduating in 1912. He worked as a principal of a high school in Chilhowie, Virginia from 1912–1913.

Diplomatic career
Waller was appointed American vice-consul in Yarmouth, Nova Scotia on 13 February 1913. From there he was appointed vice-consul in Karlsbad, Bohemia in July 1914. Waller quickly requested a transfer after Austria-Hungary entered World War I. Finding himself unable to remain neutral and yet express the sympathy necessary for a wartime post, Waller hoped to be sent to a post "in an English–speaking country outside of Canada." He wrote to his superiors that "On the other hand, by heredity, environment and ways of thought, my sympathies are, in the larger sense, fully with the Anglo Saxons and in a time like the present I am quite sure that I should be of vastly greater service among such a people." The State Department considered the request for several months, until the transfer was finally approved by Secretary of State Robert Lansing. The decision was urged by Consul Wallace J. Young and Ambassador Frederic Courtland Penfield, the latter considering Waller's attitude "seriously embarrassing." Waller was subsequently moved and served as senior vice-consul in Athens, Greece from 1915–1919.

Waller acted as vice-consul in-charge in Athens from October 1916 to May 1917 while Greece was embroiled in conflict. On 4 December 1919, he was made Knight of the Order of the Redeemer by Alexander of Greece and the Greek government. He later served as consul in Dresden, Germany.

Waller became the American chargé d'affaires in Luxembourg in 1931. He was awarded the Luxembourg War Cross on 24 June 1946. On 24 June 1948, Waller finalized the purchase of the estate that eventually became the American Embassy in Luxembourg. He shortly thereafter left the country permanently.

Works

References

1889 births
1962 deaths
People from Montgomery, Alabama
Marion Military Institute alumni
University of Virginia alumni
Alabama Democrats
20th-century American diplomats